Steph Swainston is a British literary fantasy/science fiction author, known for the Castle series. Her debut novel, The Year of Our War (2004), won the 2005 Crawford Award and a nomination for the John W. Campbell Award for Best New Writer.

Profile 
Stephanie "Steph" Jane Swainston was born in Bradford in 1974. She attended St. Joseph's College, Bradford, followed by Girton College, University of Cambridge, and the University of Wales. Outside writing, Swainston has had a broad range of occupations, which include bookseller, archaeologist, lock keeper, information scientist, and pyrotechnician.

Swainston's novels to date take place in the Fourlands, which the author has described as a secret childhood paracosm, further influenced by aspects of her later adult life, including the competitive academic world. The novels centre on the life of the Circle, an elite group of immortals created and sustained by the Emperor, a near god-like figure engaged in a prolonged conflict with insect-like creatures, apparently from another world. Told in the first person, the novels follow the life of Jant, a winged humanoid with a distinctly flawed personality. The Castle series is also marked by the existence of multiple worlds, including the fantastic, baroque "Shift". 

The novels have been labeled by others as New Weird fantasy. Swainston has argued against labeling writers, including herself, within genres, on the basis that good fantasy and mainstream literature form a continuum. She has been critical of the conservative nature of much commercial fantasy writing. Her writing, unlike most works classified as traditional fantasy  depicts drug use and graphic sex scenes, alongside the hyper-realistic depiction of warfare. Swainston describes her work as appealing to the ongoing deep structures of universal storytelling, as literature written as much in response to the author's own needs than as a response to specific market requirements.

Swainston took a break from writing in 2011 to become a chemistry teacher, but subsequently returned to writing. Her fifth novel, Fair Rebel, was published in 2016.

Bibliography

Books

Novels
 The Year of Our War (Gollancz SF, 2004) 
 No Present Like Time (Gollancz SF, 2005, hardcover) 
 The Modern World (Gollancz SF, 2007, hardback) 
 Above the Snowline (Gollancz SF, 2010, hardcover) 
 Fair Rebel (Gollancz SF, 2016, paperback)

Omnibus
 The Castle Omnibus: "The Year of Our War", "No Present Like Time", "The Modern World" (Gollancz SF, 2009, paperback) 
 Velocity's Aftermath: "Wrought Gothic", "Aftermath", "Turning Point"  (Air and Nothingness Press, 2023, paperback)

Short fiction
 "The Wheel of Fortune" (included in The Best British Fantasy 2013, Salt Publishing, 2013, paperback) 
 Wrought Gothic and Other Scenes (collection) (Air and Nothingness Press, 2016, paperback) 
 Aftermath (an excerpt from a book-length sequel to Fair Rebel entitled The Savant and the Snake, and other material) (Air and Nothingness Press, 2016, paperback) 
 Turning Point (collection) (Air and Nothingness Press, 2018, paperback) 
 "Velocity" (included in The Best of British Fantasy 2018, NewCon Press, 2019)

References

External links

Interview conducted by Jeff VanderMeer for Clarkesworld Magazine
Interview conducted in 2006 by Jay Tomio
Reviews of all three books in the Castle series
HarperCollins interview

1974 births
Living people
Alumni of Girton College, Cambridge
Alumni of the University of Wales
English fantasy writers
Writers from Bradford
Date of birth missing (living people)
British women short story writers
Women science fiction and fantasy writers
English women novelists
21st-century English women writers
21st-century English writers
21st-century British novelists
People educated at St. Joseph's Catholic College, Bradford
21st-century British short story writers
Weird fiction writers